Ahmed Eyüb Pasha (Modern Turkish: Ahmet Eyüp Paşa; 1833–1893) was an Ottoman military commander, who participated in the Russo-Turkish War (1877–78).

References

1833 births
1893 deaths
Ottoman Army generals